The Steuben Point is a Native American stone tool point found throughout central Illinois and the surrounding Midwest.  These points have a slightly convex blade, expanding stem, and straight base that sometimes exhibit basal grinding.  Culturally, the point is representative of the terminal Middle Woodland to early Late Woodland periods. The point type is technologically related to Snyders and Ansell points.

Lithics
Woodland period
Native American tools